The angular aperture of a lens is the angular size of the lens aperture as seen from the focal point:

where 
 is the focal length
 is the diameter of the aperture.

Relation to numerical aperture 

In a medium with an index of refraction close to 1, such as air, the angular aperture is approximately equal to twice the numerical aperture of the lens.

Formally, the numerical aperture in air is:

In the paraxial approximation, with a small aperture, :

References

See also
f-number
Numerical aperture
Acceptance angle, half the angular aperture
Field of view

Geometrical optics
Angle